"Breathe (2 AM)" is the debut single of American singer-songwriter Anna Nalick. The song was first released in 2004 and re-released in 2005, when it charted at number 45 on the US Billboard Hot 100 and number four on the Billboard Adult Contemporary chart. In New Zealand, it peaked at number 37. "Breathe (2 AM)" has been certified Gold by the Recording Industry Association of America.

Content
The verses tell the stories of three characters: a friend of the narrator's who has fallen into an unhappy relationship, an alcoholic soldier at Fort Bliss, and the narrator's experience of writing and performing a song. Chuck Taylor describes it as "an introspective yet confessional tale about learning to handle everyday challenges — and remembering to take time to breathe".

Track listings
In the United States, only a promotional disc of "Breathe (2 AM)" was released. In Australia, a proper CD single was issued, backed with acoustic versions of non-album track "Home" and album track "Catalyst".

Australian CD single
 "Breathe (2 AM)" – 4:40
 "Home" (acoustic version) – 2:48
 "Catalyst" (acoustic version) – 3:29

Credits and personnel
Credits are lifted from the US promo CD liner notes.

Studios
 Produced and recorded at Studio Wishbone (Muscle Shoals, Alabama, US)
 Mixed at Image Recording Studios (Hollywood, California, US)
 Mastered at The Lodge (New York City)

Personnel

 Anna Nalick – words, music, vocals
 Christopher Thorn – guitars, production, recording
 Brad Smith – bass, production, recording
 Joey Waronker – drums
 Zac Rae – piano
 Cameron Stone – cello
 Eric Rosse – string arrangement, production, recording
 Chris Lord-Alge – mixing
 Emily Lazar – mastering
 Sarah Register – mastering assistant

Charts

Weekly charts

Year-end charts

Certifications

Release history

References

2004 debut singles
2004 songs
2005 singles
Anna Nalick songs
Columbia Records singles
Pop ballads
Rock ballads
Songs written by Anna Nalick